"1, 2, 3, 4" (sometimes subtitled "I Love You") is the second single from the Plain White T's second worldwide album, Big Bad World. It reached #34 on the U.S. Billboard Hot 100 in April 2009 and was certified Platinum in June 2011, having sold over 1 million digital copies. The record has since gone 2× Platinum.

Chart performance
Since its release in December 2008, the song has been compared to the band's earlier hit "Hey There Delilah" because of its acoustic rock sound. In February 2009, "1, 2, 3, 4" began to climb on the U.S. Billboard Hot 100 chart, reaching a peak of No. 34, becoming their biggest hit on the chart after "Hey There Delilah".

On the Adult Top 40 chart, the song spent 26 weeks on the chart and peaked at No. 5.

Music video
The music video for the song premiered on the MySpace main page January 16, 2009  and was subsequently released on MTV, MTVU, VH1, Fuse, Music Choice and YouTube. It found success on the weekly VH1 Top 20 Video Countdown, charting over five months straight between January and May, peaking at #5.  It was listed on the VH1 Top 40 Videos of 2009 at #31.

Directed by Mike Venezia, the video depicts vocalist Tom Higgenson in 18-degree weather around Chicago as he busks with acoustic guitar for passing couples — captions identify each couple, along with tidbits about how and when they met.

Due to its low budget viral nature and success, the making of the video was reported on by CNN News, Chicago Sun Times, WGN News and The Bonnie Hunt Show. Additionally, a feature was added online allowing viewers to personalize the video by incorporating their own pictures.

Charts

Weekly charts

Year-end charts

Certification

References

2008 singles
2008 songs
Plain White T's songs
Hollywood Records singles
Song recordings produced by Johnny K